Chinnamul (alternate spelling Chhinnamul, lit. The Uprooted) was a 1950 Bengali film directed by Nemai Ghosh. This was the first Indian film that dealt with the partition of India. The story revolved around a group of farmers from East Pakistan (now Bangladesh) who were forced to migrate to Calcutta because of the partition of Bengal in 1947. Russian film director Vsevolod Pudovkin came to Calcutta at that time, watched this film, and being inspired, he bought the print of this film to release in Russia. The film was shown in 188 theaters in Russia.

Plot
The film is based on a story of Swarnakamal Bhattacharya. Depicting the physical pain and crisis, the film is about the partition of Bengal and the flow of refugees from East Pakistan (present Bangladesh) into India's West Bengal. The story of the film begins in a village of East Bengal where people (Hindus and Muslims) live peacefully. Govinda and Sumati are husband wife and they are about to have a child. But, the partition forces Hindu people to leave their ancestral village. So, they become refugee. They don't find any location or shelter in Calcutta and eke out their daily lives in temporary shelters in and around Sealdah railway station. Along with millions of refugees the family has to face untold misery in big city.

Cast and crew

Cast
Gangapada Basu		
Bijon Bhattacharya
Jalad Chatterjee
Shanta Devi
Ritwik Ghatak
Shanti Mitra
Prematosh Roy
Shobha Sen
Sushil Sen.

Crew
 Direction and cinematography: Nemai Ghosh.
 Writer: Swarnakamal Bhattacharya.
 Music: Kalabran Das

See also
 Pather Panchali, 1955 film directed by Satyajit Ray

References

External links

1950 films
Films set in the partition of India
Partition_of_India_in_fiction
Bengali-language Indian films
Indian black-and-white films
Films set in Kolkata
Films based on short fiction
1950s Bengali-language films
Indian drama films
1950 drama films